Emilio R. Delgado (April 14, 1901–1967) was a poet and a journalist born in Corozal, Puerto Rico. He later moved to New York.

Published Work 

Tiempos Del Amor Breve. New York: Las Américas Publishing, 1958.

Anthology. Vicente Géigel Polanco, compiler.

San Juan: Instituto de Cultura Puertorriqueña. 1976

Unpublished Work 

Cuentos para los Niños de España (1937)

Cuentos Puertorriqueños (1955)

Estudios de Folklore Puertorriqueño (1960)

Crónicas y Croniquillas

Canciones de la Pájara Pinta

Poesía Festiva

Journals 

Faro (1926)

Vórtice (1927)

Hostos (hostos) (1928)

References

People from Corozal, Puerto Rico
Puerto Rican poets
Puerto Rican male writers
Puerto Rican journalists
1901 births
1967 deaths
American male non-fiction writers
20th-century journalists
20th-century American male writers